Hyposmocoma homopyrrha is a species of moth of the family Cosmopterigidae. It was first described by Edward Meyrick in 1935. It is endemic to the Hawaiian island of Oahu. The type locality is Nuʻuanu Pali.

The larvae feed on Metrosideros species. The type specimen was bred from a larva found in dead wood.

External links

homopyrrha
Endemic moths of Hawaii
Moths described in 1935